Tiantai Mountain (also Tí Taî in the local language) is a mountain in Tiantai County, Taizhou, Zhejiang Province, China. The mountain was made a national park on 1 August 1988. One of nine remaining wild populations of Seven-Son Flower (Heptacodium miconioides) is located on mount Tiantai.

Legends
In the mythology of Traditional Chinese religion, the creator goddess Nüwa cut the legs off a giant sea turtle and used them to prop up the sky after Gong Gong damaged Mount Buzhou, which had previously supported the heavens. A local myth holds that Tiantai was on the turtle's back before and Nüwa relocated it to its current position when she had to remove the turtle's legs.

Guoqing Temple
Guoqing Temple on the mountain is the headquarters of Tiantai Buddhism, and also a tourist destination. Tiantai, named for the mountain, is an East Asian Buddhist school of Mahāyāna Buddhism that developed in 6th-century China and focuses on the Lotus Sutra. The most prominent teacher of that school, Zhiyi, was based at Guoqing Temple. Over many years it has been an important destination for pilgrims, especially from Japan. The mountain was visited by Saichō in 805 CE, who went on to found the related Japanese Buddhist school, Tendai. A Korean offshoot, the Cheontae school, was also established during the 12th century.

Ji Gong Temple
The mountain has a famous temple to the Song-era Chinese Buddhist monk Ji Gong at the Cave of Auspicious Mists that was associated with early modern fuji or "spirit writing" movements.

Transport
 Tiantaishan railway station

References

Buddhist sites in China
Mountains of Zhejiang
National parks of China
Qing dynasty architecture
Sacred Mountains of China
Sui dynasty
Tourist attractions in Zhejiang